Mick Ives (born 10 August 1939) is an English former professional racing cyclist from Coventry. Ives has been the UCI World Masters Cycling Champion five times, and the British national cycling champion 62 times (with five championships won in 2007). He was at one time the manager of the Great Britain cycling team, and the National Coach, and is the winner of over 1000 races.

Mick Ives now runs the Team Jewson MI Racing Team, which he formed in 1997. The team has won more than 1,000 races all over the UK and mainland Europe.

Ives became the first pensioner to complete the Tour de France route in 2005. Riding alone two days ahead of the big race itself, Ives completed the 3,608 km distance under par, in just 20 days, having ridden two of the stages in one day. He is the only rider in the world known to complete the race route solo.

Palmarès

1960
2nd Overall, Dun Laoghaire
1st Stage 1, Dun Laoghaire
2nd Stage 2, Dun Laoghaire
2nd Stage 3, Dun Laoghaire

1964
3rd Grand Prix of Essex

1966
1st Bagshot, Cyclo-cross

1975
1st Archer Spring Road Race

2000
1st UCI Cyclo-cross World Championships, Masters, 60-64

2001
1st UCI Cyclo-cross World Championships, Masters, 60-64

2002
2nd UCI Cyclo-cross World Championships, Masters, 60-64

2003
3rd UCI Cyclo-cross World Championships, Masters, 60-64

2004
1st UCI Cyclo-cross World Championships, Masters, 65-69

2005
1st UCI Cyclo-cross World Championships, Masters, 65-69

2006
1st UCI Cyclo-cross World Championships, Masters, 65-69

2007
2nd UCI Cyclo-cross World Championships, Masters, 65-69

2012
2nd UCI Cyclo-cross World Championships, Masters, 70-74

References

External links 
 miracing.co.uk
 

1939 births
English male cyclists
Sportspeople from Coventry
Living people